Ashlee Wells (born 1 August 1989) is a retired Australian field hockey player who plays as a goalkeeper. Wells was a member of the Australia women's national field hockey team that were defeated by the Netherlands women's national field hockey team in the final of the 2014 Women's Hockey World Cup. She debuted for Australia in October, 2011 and announced her retirement in January 2022. Her former club is Churchill HC, Latrobe, Victoria. Wells’ mother influenced her to pick up a hockey stick at age five. After working for Hockey Victoria, Wells decided to join the national squad in Perth in 2011. Some recent competitions Wells participated in include the 2015 World League, 2014 Champions Trophy, 2014 World Cup, 2013 World League and the 2013 Oceania Cup. She was also the reserve Goalkeeper for the London 2012 Olympics, while her first major international tournament was the Junior World Cup in 2009.

References

External links
 
 
 

1989 births
Living people
Australian female field hockey players
Female field hockey goalkeepers
Sportswomen from Victoria (Australia)
People from Moe, Victoria
21st-century Australian women